The Montana Dinosaur Center is a 501(c)(3) non-profit and educational institute located in Bynum, Montana that opened in 1995. It is part of the Montana Dinosaur Trail and home to a skeletal model of what is believed to be the world's longest dinosaur, a diplodocus.
The center also houses the first baby dinosaur bones collected in North America - the original discovery done by Marion Brandvold and reported by paleontologist John R. Horner.

In addition to the above-mentioned displays, the center houses specimens of new species of several types of dinosaurs, including hadrosaurs, ceratopsians, and tyrannosaurs. The mission of the center is to incorporate public education with scientific research, and the center offers the widest variety of paleontology programs available to the public.

The Montana Dinosaur Center is one of 2 museums in Montana that employ degreed paleontological staff. The center provides assistance and expertise to other Montana Dinosaur Trail facilities in addition to conducting its own research and public education programs. It is open 7 days a week from Memorial Day through Labor Day and with varying hours the rest of the year.

References

External links
The Montana Dinosaur Center

Museums in Teton County, Montana
Natural history museums in Montana
Tourist attractions in Teton County, Montana
Dinosaur museums in the United States
Paleontology in Montana